The Vodacom Players Championship was a golf tournament on the Sunshine Tour that was held in South Africa. It was founded as the FNB Players Championship in 1992 and was played for the final time in 2002. In 1996, it was also included on the schedule of the European Tour.

Winners

Notes

References

External links
Coverage on the European Tour's official site

Former Sunshine Tour events
Former European Tour events
Golf tournaments in South Africa
1992 establishments in South Africa
2002 disestablishments in South Africa
Recurring sporting events established in 1992
Recurring sporting events disestablished in 2002